Parachalastinus is a genus of beetles in the family Cerambycidae, containing the following species:

 Parachalastinus championi (Bates, 1885)
 Parachalastinus flavescens Julio, 2005
 Parachalastinus nigrescens Galileo & Martins, 2001
 Parachalastinus rubrocinctus (Bates, 1869)

References

Anisocerini